The Boris Mirski Gallery (1944-1979) was a Boston art gallery owned by Boris Chaim Mirski (1898-1974). The gallery was known for exhibiting key figures in Boston Expressionism, New York and international modern art styles and non-western art. For years, the gallery dominated with both figurative and African work.  As an art dealer, Mirski was known for supporting young, emerging artists, including many Jewish-Americans, as well as artists of color, women artists and immigrants. As a result of Mirski's avant-garde approach to art and diversified approach to dealing art, the gallery was at the center of Boston's burgeoning modern mid-century art scene, as well as instrumental in the birth and development of Boston Expressionism, the most significant branch of American Figurative Expressionism.

Organization

Founder 
Born to a well-to-do Jewish lumber dealer in Vilnius, Lithuania, Mirski was raised amid "pomp ... pogroms and persecution". He immigrated to the U.S. in 1912 at age 14, settling with a maternal aunt. His first job involved "lugging room molding on his shoulders", and linked both his father's field, and a key future source of his earnings as a framer. In between, Mirski studied sculpture, and found employment on a merchant vessel that allowed him to travel the world.

Art New England writer Lois Tarlow called Mirski "a colorful figure who played an important and daring role in bringing young avant-garde artists to the Boston public, [who] was also a disarming and lovable rogue". Painter Ralph Coburn, who assisted gallery director Hyman Swetzoff at Mirski's Gallery, describes "elements of slapstick comedy, working for Mirski.... He was short, rotund, balding, immensely powerful, strong. He was physically strong. He could lift all kinds of stuff. He was ambitious. He was immensely charming. He was a scoundrel. I loved working for him."

The Boston Globe posthumously assessed Mirski in more dignified fashion, calling him "a figure of pivotal significant in Boston art for more than half-a-century". In the Globe obituary, they also traced his first Boston gallery back to 1916, counted another three galleries, and several locales until they reached his second to last, on Charles Street, where the art part was subsidized by a frame shop, a posh clientele and his growing appeal to local artists.

In 1935, Mirski moved the gallery to upscale Newbury Street where it would remain for the next four decades. In 1945, he moved into the red brick mansion at 166 Newbury Street, the historic heart of Boston's art scene, and right next door to the "stuffy" Guild of Boston Artists and only steps away from the Boston Museum of Modern Art, a sister museum to the Museum of Modern Art (MOMA) that evolved into the Institute of Contemporary Art, Boston (ICA) in 1948. Here, he opened a larger gallery, a frame shop and a school in the building he bought in 1945, at the depressed wartime price of $500. In the 1950s, 101 Bradford Street in Provincetown, Massachusetts also served as the Mirski Gallery's summertime residence.

In 1979, the Boris Mirski Gallery on 166 Newbury Street Gallery finally closed. Mirski, himself, had died five years earlier, in 1974, in Tel Aviv, Israel.

National attention 
In the fall of 1946, the Mirski Gallery's first exhibition debuted with 53 paintings by the Guatemalan "Indian" cubist Carlos Mérida. The Boston Globe highlighted critic A.J. Philpott's confusion in the review's headline: "Merida Moderns May Be Childish or Wonderful — Philpott Baffled". A week later, Time magazine commented that some critics already considered Mérida's work worthy of expanding "The Big Three of Latin American art" (Rivera, Orozco, Siqueiros)' to four.

In 1949, Mirski, who did not then represent Hyman Bloom (1913-2009), borrowed work from the Museum of Modern Art, Harvard and Durlacher Gallery in New York, and organized a Bloom retrospective at the Mirski Gallery. The show was meant to build on Bloom's 1942 group show success at MOMA, which had hung 13 of his paintings and purchased two of them. Soon after, the career-making critic Clement Greenberg referred to Bloom as "the greatest artist in America". As former Danforth Museum of Art Director Katherine French described it, "There was a period of about six months when Hyman Bloom was the most important painter in the world, and probably a period of about five years when he was the most important painter in America." Mirski's show garnered praise from Time magazine, which commented that the show's most newsworthy paintings "seemed to come straight from charnel house and morgue". They also praised Mirski as "an old hand at presenting local artists to Boston society". In critic Sydney Freedberg's Art News review, he called Bloom, "a painter of the first importance within his generation". Abstract expressionist stars Jackson Pollock and Willem de Kooning, meanwhile, called him "the first abstract expressionist in America".

Boston school of expressionist art 

After establishing the gallery on the main floor of his new building, Mirski subsidized it with a frame shop in the basement. "He was juggling everything, the frame shop, the mortgages", painter Ralph Coburn (born 1923) said. "He kept refinancing the building, which he bought for a song, but sometimes business was bad and the thing that held the gallery together was the frame shop, and so he managed." In 1982, Alan Fink, then owner of the Alpha Gallery, explained to The Boston Globe that few galleries survive on selling contemporary work, citing the costs of publicity and the opening night reception as a few of the many expenditures gallerists face. Mirski handled some of these expenditures by diversifying his sources of income and by enlisting artists to help with the publicity. Mirski artist Leonard Baskin (1922-2000), for example, engraved Mirski's gallery mark for him in 1956. Baskin also created many of his own exhibition posters, which he later collected in a book.

In addition, Mirski created "a school ... on the third floor where he had some of his people teaching there — John [Woodrow] Wilson (1922–2015), Esther Geller (1921-2015)". Later, Carl Nelson who had studied at the Art Students League of New York, and who later became a "piller of the Cambridge Art Association", joined the staff. He was "[a] man of an enormous ... influence, [he] had a different method of teaching from the Museum School.... He was able to visualize the whole painting."

The gallery was used for exhibitions and art-related lectures, including, for example, a series on Mérida that coincided with the gallery's first show. According to painter Ralph Coburn, Mirski was also known for giving "wonderful parties" ... [t]here was a large mailing list.... that perhaps Hyman Swetzoff had brought over from the Institute of Modern Art, and it consisted of all kinds of museum directors and collectors especially in Boston."

Mirski's gallery also served as home base for local art activism. In the late 1940s, many artists, including Karl Zerbe (1903-1972) and Hyman Bloom began meeting to address fears that the recently renamed ICA was, like the Museum of Fine Arts, shutting out local artists.  The meetings inspired the formation of the New England Chapter of Artists Equity and the Boston Arts Festival, with the former advocating for artists' rights and representation, and the latter providing a democratic fine arts forum in the middle of Boston's Public Garden.

The result was a "sea change" described by art historian Charles Giuliano in the late 1940s, altering Boston's notoriously conservative art scene, which had long been dominated by genteel Impressionist painters of the historic Boston School, with few local collectors or galleries interested in collecting or exhibiting modern art:The faculty and focus of the School of the Museum of Fine Arts changed from polite and innocuous, ersatz American Impressionism to gritty and graphic Boston Expressionism. The old guard and its socially acceptable artists showed with the Copley Society of Art or the Guild of Boston Artists. The young Turks, Jews, and immigrants or their sons—like the Lebanese-American Gibran—showed with gallerist Boris Mirski or his former assistants Hyman Swetzoff and Alan Fink of Alpha Gallery.The gallery also hosted exchange shows with Edith Halpert's Downtown Gallery in New York, serving as an important venue for the broader Northeast, as well as for local artists who were Jewish or foreign-born like Hyman Bloom, Giglio Dante (1914-2006) and Kahlil Gibran (1883-1931), Black like John Woodrow Wilson or female like Marianna Pineda (1925-1996) and Joyce Reopel (1932-2019). Alan Fink (1926-2017), who managed the gallery in the 1950s and early 60s, later recalled:The Mirski Gallery was very conservative by today's standards, but in the '50s it was considered daring. We got protests for showing artists who are now famous and not considered controversial in the least, artists like Hans Hoffmann and Leonard Baskin. And the Boston police once took a picture of a nude out of our window... Mirski and a couple of other galleries were the only ones selling modern art in Boston at the time.

Artists 

Mirski cultivated his artists by providing direct support in much the same way he cultivated his businesses. In the case of Bernard Chaet, that included funding his first art tour of Europe, mounting his first show in 1946, and recommending him for his first teaching job at Yale. But Mirski's combination support for paid work, exhibitions and study appealed to experienced artists too. Two of the most influential were successive directors of the Department of Drawing and Painting at the School of the Museum of Fine Arts, Boston: Alexander Jacovleff (1887-1938) Karl Zerbe (1903-1972) who served for three years each, starting with Jacovleff in 1934 and ending with Zerbe in 1940. The latter's emphasis on individualism helped attract artists like David Aronson (1923-2015), Bernard Chaet (1924-2012), Reed Kay, Arthur Polonsky, Jack Kramer (1923-1984), Barbara Swan (1922-2003), Andrew Kooistra (1926-), and Lois Tarlow.

Boston Globe critic Robert Taylor contrasted Mirski's aesthetic with that of two other important Boston gallerists, Margaret Brown and Hyman Swetzoff. Mirski, he said, introduced an "urban, Jewish, introverted and lyrical" visual sensibility to Boston. In Mirski's obituary, he extrapolated, describing Mirski's Boston school of artists as "ethnic, urban and strident.... It had a sardonic eye. In style the images were figurative, and Rembrandt's lighting, Rembrandt's Biblical drama enthralled the Boston artists, though they were also open to German Expressionism and some aspects of Matisse and Rouault."

By name 
(Key figures are listed below, but the list is not comprehensive.)

 David Aronson
 Leonard Baskin
 Jason Berger
 Hyman Bloom
 William Brice
 Bernard Chaet
 Ralston Crawford
 Esther Geller
 Kahlil Gibran
 Hans Hofmann
 Ellsworth Kelly
 Lawrence Kupferman
 Rico Lebrun
 Jack Levine
 Michael Mazur
 Carlos Mérida
 George Lovett Kingsland Morris
 Carl Gustaf Nelson
 Georgia O'Keeffe
 Arthur Polonsky
 Joyce Reopel
 Ben Shahn
 Mitchell Siporin
 William Steig
 Barbara Swan
 Harold Tovish
 John Woodrow Wilson
 Mel Zabarsky
 Karl Zerbe

By representative work 
(Selection was limited by availability.)

By photo 
(Selection was limited by availability.)

Legacy

American art 
Boris Mirski's family donated the records of the Boris Mirski Gallery (1944-1979) in stages, between 1989 and 2017 to the Archives of American Art. Several key figures in Boston Expressionism, with links to Mirski, have also given oral history interviews to the Archives, including Hyman Bloom, David Aronson, Jack Levine, Marianna Pineda, Arthur Polonsky, Karl Zerbe and Ralph Coburn.

Related galleries 
On and off, Mirski employed both of the Swetzoff brothers: Seymour and Hyman. Hyman, however, had also worked at the nearby Institute of Modern Art, and he ultimately served as Mirski's Gallery director. In 1948, he and his brother decided to open a gallery of their own. Their gallery began as the Frameshop Gallery on Huntington Avenue, but Hyman became director in 1953, and moved it to Newbury Street, renaming it the Swetzoff Gallery (1948-1968) in the process. The gallery closed in 1968 when Hyman died.

Alan Fink served as Mirski's gallery director for 16 years. A "founding member of the Boston Art Dealers association", he founded the Alpha Gallery (1967–present), also on Newbury Street, along the Mirski model in 1967. Already married to painter Barbara Swan, a former Mirski artist, Fink began by representing "Swan's work and later that of their son Aaron, a figurative expressionist painter, [t]heir daughter, Joanna, ran the gallery for many years." The gallery, which continues to operate, eventually relocated to the South End of Boston.

See also 
Edith Halpert
Art dealer
Art gallery
Modern art
Art movement
20th-century art
American Figurative Expressionism
Boston Expressionism

References

Bibliography 
 
 
 
 
Giuliano, Charles (2017). Boston Art Dealer Alan Fink is Dead: Art Was the Family Business. Retrieved October 26, 2020.

Further reading 
 

Art galleries established in 1944
1979 disestablishments in Massachusetts
Defunct art museums and galleries in Boston
Federal Art Project artists
Archives of American Art-related articles
American Figurative Expressionism
Abstract expressionism
Abstract expressionist artists
Jewish-American history
Jewish American artists
Boston expressionism
≥